Cameroon competed at the 2010 Summer Youth Olympics, the inaugural Youth Olympic Games, held in Singapore from 14 August to 26 August 2010. The Cameroon team will consist of 6 athletes competing in 5 sports: Athletics, Canoeing, Judo, Swimming and Weightlifting.

Athletics

Boys
Track and road events

Canoeing

Boys

Judo

Individual

Team

Swimming

Weightlifting

References

External links
Competitors List: Cameroon

Nations at the 2010 Summer Youth Olympics
2010 in Cameroonian sport
Cameroon at the Youth Olympics